Pebble Brain is the second EP by English indie rock band Lovejoy, released independently through Anvil Cat on 14 October 2021. With seven tracks, it is a follow-up to their debut EP Are You Alright?, issued in May 2021. It debuted at number 12 on the UK Albums Chart and held positions in ten international charts.

Background and release
Lovejoy was formed in 2021 and debuted with the EP Are You Alright?, released on 9 May 2021. The same month, the band appeared on Billboard's Emerging Artists chart at number 10. All four of the EP's tracks peaked on the UK Independent Singles Chart, with "One Day" at number 5 and positions in four other international charts.

On 14 October 2021, following the release of numerous track demos online, Pebble Brain was released digitally. Frontman Wilbur Soot, real name William Gold, revealed the EP had taken over a year to complete, and that the track "Perfume" originally did not make the final cut. One year after its original release, the EP received its first pressing to vinyl.

Composition
Critics found Pebble Brains lyricism to concern two main themes – relationships and politics. Opening track "Oh Yeah, You Gonna Cry?" is written from the "point of view of someone watching the current relationship of a potential romantic interest come to an end", and is thematically similar to "Concrete", written about a failed relationship. Sonically, reviewers found tracks to maintain "familiar horns, exciting percussion, and similar guitar riffs", however such repetitive instrumentation made tracks "truly lack distinction from each other". Political allusions can be found in tracks "Model Buses" and "You'll Understand When You're Older", regarding then-Prime Minister Boris Johnson stating that "he makes model buses in his free time", and the impact of the COVID-19 pandemic on service workers respectively. "The Fall", written about the "wealthy upper class", stood out to reviewers for its "higher emphasis on the dark bass to the lyrical message to [Gold's] speech at the end, an awe-inspiring mix between spoken word and rap". In terms of production, the EP was criticised by some outlets for issues with mixing, with one explaining "the lead singer's voice is sometimes hard to hear over the high-energy drums and guitar".

Reception

The EP received generally positive reviews. Timothy Monger of AllMusic wrote Pebble Brain features "improved production value" compared to their debut, concluding "[Gold's] song subjects are sometimes as frenetic as the band's delivery, but are often quite enjoyable". A reviewer for Teen Ink found flaws in the closing track, writing "the beat was unattractive, and the song as a whole felt rushed and uninteresting", though highly praised "Perfume" as "a much easier track to appreciate the poetical essence Lovejoy crafts".

Track listing

Notes
 "It's All Futile! It's All Pointless!" is a re-recording of a track on Gold's 2019 EP, Maybe I Was Boring.

Personnel
This section is adapted from Genius.

 William Gold – lead vocals, rhythm guitar, songwriter
 Joe Goldsmith – lead guitar, songwriter
 Ash Kabosu – bass, songwriter
 Mark Boardman – drums, songwriter
 Sam Coveney – producer

Charts

Release history

Notes

References

External links
 

2021 EPs
Indie rock EPs
Indie pop EPs